"What About Your Friends" is a song by American group TLC, released as the third single from their debut album, Ooooooohhh... On the TLC Tip (1992). It was released on August 21, 1992, and reached number seven on the Billboard Hot 100, becoming the group's third consecutive top-10 single. A remix to the single, titled "What About Your Friends (Extended Mix)" includes the first ever appearance by the Atlanta hip-hop duo Outkast.

Composition
"What About Your Friends" was written by Dallas Austin and TLC member Lisa "Left Eye" Lopes,  and features lead vocals by T-Boz. The song samples "Blues & Pants" by James Brown.

Critical reception
Daryl McIntosh from Albumism noted that "What About Your Friends" "calls into question the topic of loyalty and true friendship, making you evaluate the character of those within your inner circle."

Music video
The main performance scenes of the music video for "What About Your Friends" are the girls walking in an alley surrounded by backup dancers, underneath a bridge, on an outside staircase, on an apartment roof, in a slushie bar and wearing graffiti clothes in front of a graffiti-covered wall. Two versions of the video were made: one focuses on more of the performance shots of the girls and scenes of them infiltrating a stylish fashion show, while the other features scenes of a party in a big park where the girls are being very happy, dancing and having fun with their friends and some family members; including a scene of them reprising their roles as hillbillies from the "Ain't 2 Proud 2 Beg" video at the end. Jermaine Dupri makes a cameo appearance.

Commercial performance
The song reached number seven on the Billboard Hot 100, becoming the group's third consecutive top ten single, and reached No. 2 on the Hot R&B Singles chart, behind "Games" by Chuckii Booker. The single was  certified gold by the RIAA. In the United Kingdom, "What About Your Friends" peaked at No. 59.

Charts

Weekly charts

Year-end charts

Certifications

Release history

References

1992 singles
1992 songs
Arista Records singles
LaFace Records singles
Song recordings produced by Dallas Austin
Songs written by Dallas Austin
Songs written by Lisa Lopes
TLC (group) songs